Ivanka Popović (born 1959) is a Serbian professor and the incumbent rector of the University of Belgrade since October 1, 2018. She authored and co-authored more than 85 scientific documents.

Biography 
She studied chemical engineering at the University of Maryland, she finished her studies at Faculty of Technology and Metallurgy of the University of Belgrade, where she earned her doctorate. She became a professor at the University of Belgrade in 2001. She was chosen for rector of the University of Belgrade in May 2018 and she was sworn in same year on October 1.

References 

1959 births
Living people
Academic staff of the University of Belgrade
People from Rio de Janeiro (city)